D&D was a Japanese eurobeat idol group, featuring vocalist Olivia, and dancers Chikano and Aya. They debuted in 1996 with the single "In Your Eyes," and disbanded in 1999. Vocalist Olivia debuted as a solo musician in 1999, and sung several theme songs for the anime Nana in 2006.

Biography

The three members of D&D attended the Okinawa Actors School, and were scouted by Rising Production for record company Avex Trax, debuting in 1996. Their first two singles, "In Your Eyes" and "Love Is a Melody" were used as background music for commercials for Yuri Takano Beauty Clinic that featured Namie Amuro as their spokesperson. As vocalist Olivia was not very confident in Japanese at the time of the group's debut, most songs were sung in English. Their third single, "Sunshine Hero," was used in a commercial for Morinaga's Piknik confectionery, which featured D&D themselves.

In March 1998, the group released their debut album Love Is a Melody: D&D Memorial 1st. It was commercially successful, debuting at number 5 on Oricon's albums chart, and was certified gold by the RIAJ for more than 250,000 copies shipped to stores. After Olivia participated in a collaboration song with Jean Michel Jarre and Tetsuya Komuro written for the 1998 FIFA World Cup, "Together Now," she began releasing material as a soloist. Chikano and Aya continued to release music together, as Aya & Chika from D&D. They released the single "Kiss in the Sun" in September 1998, followed by the opening theme song for the anime Power Stone, "Rise in My Heart," in April 1999. The group intended to release a third single in September 1999, however this was cancelled.

In July 2000, Aya and Chikano joined the girl group Hipp's, who performed in the television show The Night of Hit Parade, although Aya left the group several months later. The group, featuring Chika using her real name , made their CD debut in 2001 with the song "Go! Go! Girl!" However, after only one single the band disbanded. In February 2009, Japanese magician Tatsuya Naka posted in his personal blog about attending Chika's wedding in Kyoto, to one of his childhood friends.

Discography

Album

Singles

Other appearances

Notes

References

External links
Official Site
D&D Oricon Profile
Aya & Chika Oricon Profile

Avex Group artists
Japanese pop music groups
Japanese idol groups
Japanese girl groups
Musical groups established in 1996
Musical groups disestablished in 1999
Musical groups from Okinawa Prefecture